Racinaea nervibractea is a plant species in the genus Racinaea. This species is native to Bolivia and Ecuador.

References

nervibractea
Flora of Bolivia
Flora of Ecuador